Applause Entertainment, a venture of the Aditya Birla Group of Companies, headed by Sameer Nair is a media, content and IP creation studio.

Television shows

Films

References

External links
 Official Website

Streaming television
Television production companies of India
Indian companies established in 2017
Entertainment companies established in 2017
Aditya Birla Group